Ramon “Mon-Mon” Velicaria Guico III (born March 19, 1975) is a Filipino politician who is the 31st and current Governor of Pangasinan since his inauguration in 2022. Prior to his governorship, he has served as representative for Pangasinan's 5th congressional district from 2019 to 2022 and as the mayor of Binalonan from 2010 to 2019.

Personal life 
Guico was born on March 19, 1975, in Quezon City, Philippines. His father, Ramon Guico Jr., is a former Municipal Mayor of Binalonan and the National President of the League of Municipalities of the Philippines from 2001 to 2010. His mother is Arlyn Grace V. Guico, a pharmacist and President/CEO of WorldCiti Medical Hospital.

Education
He attended Ateneo de Manila University in high school (1993). He obtained his bachelor's degree in Philosophy (1997), Certificate in Professional Education, and Master's degree in Education (2004) from the University of the Philippines Diliman. He also earned a doctorate degree in Public Management from the Pamantasan ng Lungsod ng Maynila in 2005. He also pursued his interest in aviation and aeronautics and turned it into a profession by becoming a licensed commercial pilot.

Family
Guico and his wife, Maan Tuazon Guico, have four children.

References 

1975 births
Living people
Mayors of places in Pangasinan
People from Quezon City
University of the Philippines Diliman alumni
Pamantasan ng Lungsod ng Maynila alumni
Members of the House of Representatives of the Philippines from Pangasinan